Bistrița Monastery may refer to two Romanian Orthodox monasteries:
 Bistrița Monastery (Neamț)
 Bistrița Monastery (Vâlcea)